The Visalia Unified School District is a school district in Tulare County, California. The school district covers an area of 214 miles, and includes 26 elementary schools, a newcomer language assessment center, five middle schools, four  comprehensive high schools, a continuation high school, an adult school, a charter alternative academy, a charter independent study school, a K-8 charter home school, and a school that serves orthopedic handicapped students. The VUSD area has a population base of over 135,000 people, over 32,000 of which are served by the school district. VUSD has long-standing investment in Career Technical Education, with over 4,000 students involved in the programs through the four comprehensive high schools as well as Sequoia High School, Visalia Technical Early College and Visalia Charter Independent Study. VUSD offers Career Technical Education pathways in 13 of the 15 industry sectors recognized by the State of California. VUSD offers the following Linked Learning Academies: Agricultural Biosciences & Technology; Architecture & Engineering; Business Finance Academy; Computer Science; First Responders; Health Sciences; Law & Justice; Media Arts; and Sports, Therapy, Rehabilitation, Orthopedics and Neuromuscular Gains (STRONG). Through the academies, VUSD students enjoy job shadowing and internship opportunities as part of their career exploration. VUSD also offers Summer University, a college and career academy-based program open to all middle school students. During the school year, VUSD offers Saturday University, which provides enrichment and academic opportunities for all high school and middle school students. Art, music, physical education, science, math, reading and technology are among the programs offered. Through a partnership with ProYouth Visalia, nearly 5,000 students participate in after-school enrichment programs each school day. VUSD also offers a wide range of extra-curricular programs (such as performing arts and athletics) as well as co-curricular programs (such as debate competitions, animal husbandry, robotics competitions and more).

History
Visalia Unified School District was established in 1965. VUSD was created by the unification of Visalia Union High School and the elementary districts it served. It had among its origins the Packwood School, created in 1845, and the Visalia City School District created in 1855. With that ancestry, VUSD can claim to be the oldest school district in Tulare County.

Schools

Elementary schools 
Annie R. Mitchell Elementary School
Conyer Elementary School
Cottonwood Creek Elementary School
Crestwood Elementary School
Crowley Elementary School
Denton Elementary School
Elbow Creek Elementary School
Fairview Elementary School
Four Creeks Elementary School
Golden Oak Elementary School
Goshen Elementary School
Highland Elementary School
Houston Elementary School
Hurley Elementary School
Ivanhoe Elementary School
Linwood Elementary School
Manuel F. Hernandez Elementary School
Mineral King Elementary School
Mountain View Elementary School
Oak Grove Elementary School
Pinkham Elementary School
Riverway Elementary School 
Royal Oaks Elementary School
Shannon Ranch Elementary School
Veva Blunt Elementary School
Washington Elementary School
Willow Glen Elementary School

Middle schools 
Divisadero Middle School
Green Acres Middle School
La Joya Middle School
Ridgeview Middle School
Valley Oak Middle School

High schools 
El Diamante High School
Golden West High School
Mt. Whitney High School
Redwood High School
Sequoia High School

Other Visalia District Schools 
Visalia Adult School
Charter Alternative Academy
Charter Home School
River Bend School
Visalia Charter Independent Study
Global Learning Charter School

References

External links
 

School districts in Tulare County, California
School districts established in 1885
Education in Visalia, California
1885 establishments in California